Cell division cycle-associated 7-like protein is a protein that in humans is encoded by the CDCA7L gene.

References

External links

Further reading